James P. Testerman is a prominent labor leader in Pennsylvania and former president of the Pennsylvania State Education Association. He taught in York, Pennsylvania for over 16 years. He currently serves as Director of Collective Bargaining and Member Advocacy for the National Education Association.

He was named to the Pennsylvania Report "PA Report 100" list of politically influential individuals in Pennsylvania.

References

Living people
People from York County, Pennsylvania
Political activists from Pennsylvania
Workers' rights activists
Year of birth missing (living people)